The Commissioner's Office of China's Foreign Ministry in the Hong Kong S.A.R., previously known as the Office of the Commissioner of the Ministry of Foreign Affairs of the People's Republic of China in the Hong Kong Special Administrative Region, is an subordinated office of the Ministry of Foreign Affairs of the People's Republic of China established in accordance with the provisions of the Basic Law of Hong Kong. It is responsible for dealing with foreign affairs related to the territory.

The premises of the office is located at 42, Kennedy Road, Mid-levels, at the intersection of Kennedy Road and Macdonnell Road. It also owns property nearby, including staff quarters and the official residence of the Commissioner. 

A similar office of the ministry is also established in Macau, another special administrative region of the People's Republic of China.

History 

On 2 March 2021, Song Ruan, then the deputy commissioner of the office, was the guest of honor at a private dinner at a Wan Chai social club to celebrate his departure from the position, and attendees were later fined for breaking COVID-19 social gathering restrictions.

In April 2021, a spokesman for the office commented on US ambassador Hanscom Smith's criticism of Hong Kong's arrest of Jimmy Lai, stating that "No external forces are allowed to comment on the Hong Kong court's lawful judgment on people such as Lai. The US envoy has damaged the rule of law by glorifying and justifying their acts."

Also in April 2021, the deputy commissioner, Fang Jianming, said that the government was ready to strike back at calls from Chris Patten to sanction government officials "responsible for the crackdown on the pro-democracy movement in Hong Kong."

In September 2021, the Office published a list of more than 100 "crimes" that the United States committed against Hong Kong. It listed an instance where the US Consulate in Hong Kong had put electric candles in its windows on 4 June 2021, in remembrance of the 1989 Tiananmen Square protests and massacre, as an offense.

In September 2022, the Office criticized the FCC, saying "The FCC and some Western politicians ignored the facts and took every opportunity to attack the SAR government and supported anti-China forces in Hong Kong, which fully exposed their intention of meddling with the rule of law in the SAR and disrupting Hong Kong in the name of press freedom. Their tricks will bite the dust."

In January 2023, the Office said that the UK should stop issuing its half-yearly reports on Hong Kong, saying the reports "grossly interfered with Hong Kong affairs and China's internal affairs, and seriously trampled on international law." One of the reports stated that "Freedoms are being systematically eroded by Beijing on multiple fronts, tightening the restrictions on the lives of ordinary Hongkongers."

Later in January 2023, after the United States extended visas for certain Hongkongers in the United States, the Office said that the US was providing a refuge for "anti-China forces who have left Hong Kong."

See also 

 Ministry of Foreign Affairs of the People's Republic of China 
 Office of the Commissioner of the Ministry of Foreign Affairs of the People's Republic of China in the Macao Special Administrative Region
 Consular missions in Hong Kong
 Hong Kong Economic and Trade Office
 Liaison Office of the Central People's Government in the Hong Kong Special Administrative Region

References

External links 

Official website

Ministry of Foreign Affairs of the People's Republic of China
Foreign relations of Hong Kong
Government buildings in Hong Kong